Cosseys Reservoir is a lake in the Auckland Region of New Zealand.

See also
List of lakes in New Zealand

References

Lakes of the Auckland Region